David Dundas, Lord Dundas (8 June 1854 – 14 February 1922) was a Scottish politician and judge.

Life

The youngest son of George Dundas (1802–1869), one of the Senators of the College of Justice in Scotland, and of late Elizabeth Mackenzie, he was educated at Edinburgh Academy, Balliol College, Oxford and the University of Edinburgh.

He was admitted to the Scottish Bar in 1878, and was an Advocate Depute from 1890 to 1892, Interim Sheriff of Argyllshire from 1896 to 1898. He was appointed a Queen's Counsel in 1897.

Unsuccessful Conservative parliamentary candidate for Linlithgowshire at the 1900 General Election, he held office as Solicitor General for Scotland in the Conservative government from 1903 until 1905, when he was appointed a Senator of the College of Justice (following in his father's footsteps) with the judicial title Lord Dundas.

He is buried with his parents and siblings (including William John Dundas) in Warriston Cemetery in Edinburgh. The grave stands at the north side of the main upper east–west path, towards its western end.

References 

1854 births
1922 deaths
Members of the Faculty of Advocates
Scottish politicians
Dundas
Solicitors General for Scotland
19th-century King's Counsel
Deputy Lieutenants of Edinburgh
People educated at Edinburgh Academy
Alumni of Balliol College, Oxford
Alumni of the University of Edinburgh
Scottish sheriffs
Scottish King's Counsel